Hartashen is a village in the Goris Municipality of the Syunik Province in Armenia.

Toponymy 
The village has previously been known as Aigedzor, Azatashen-Alighuli, Këru, At’ghunk’, Alikulik’yand, Last, Alighulashen, Alighuli Ashaghy and Dzorashen.

Demographics

Population 
The Statistical Committee of Armenia reported its population was 717 in 2010, up from 662 at the 2001 census.

References 

Populated places in Syunik Province